Windrow is a surname. Notable people with the surname include:

George C. Windrow (1931–2019), American politician and soldier
John Edwin Windrow (1899–1984), American educator
Martin Windrow (born 1944), British historian, editor, and author